22 Pashons - Coptic calendar - 24 Pashons

Fixed commemorations
All fixed commemorations below are observed on 23 Pashons (31 May) by the Coptic Orthodox Church.

Saints
Saint Junia
Saint Julian of Alexandria and his Mother

References
Coptic Synexarion

Days of the Coptic calendar